The Copenhagen Zoological Museum (Danish: Zoologisk Museum) is a part of the Natural History Museum of Denmark, which is affiliated with the University of Copenhagen.

History 
The Zoological Museum It is among the world's oldest natural history museums, as its collection was started by Ole Worm more than 350 years ago, although it was officially founded in 1862.

Collections 
The zoological collections contain some 10 million specimens representing an estimated 10 % of described multicellular animal species. The history of the collections reach back in time more than 200 years. Apart from rich collections of Danish animals, the museum has strong representation of:

 The North Atlantic and Arctic (especially Greenland)
 The former Danish colonies in the West Indies
 East Africa (especially the Eastern Arc mountains)
 South American insects (especially butterflies)
 Philippines, Bismarck and Solomon Islands
 Deep Sea faunas
 Whale skeletons
 Material from several expeditions; Ingolf 1892, Galathea 2 (1950-52), Atlantide (1932), P.W. Lund (Lagoa Santa 1832–44)

Exhibitions 
The permanent exhibition 'From pole to pole' show animals from around the world in big displays. There is also a Charles Darwin exhibition (with the largest collection of Darwin specimens, mainly barnacles, outside the Natural History Museum, London) and a full collection of animals in the Danish territory, including Greenland. The museum has many important remains of recently extinct birds in storage, including the eyes and internal organs of the last two great auks, several specimens of the pied raven, and one of only two known complete skulls of the dodos that were taken to Europe in the 17th century. Other notable examples include the only known specimen of the spider Pardosa danica, some of the first discovered remains of the saola, and fossils of ancient animals like the transitional Ichthyostega and a Diplodocus nicknamed "Misty".

Gallery

References

External links 

 
 
 

 

Natural history museums in Denmark
Museums in Copenhagen
University museums in Denmark
University of Copenhagen
Museums established in 1862
1862 establishments in Denmark